Qeynarjeh or Qeynarjah or Qinarjeh or Qainarjeh or Qaynarjeh, also rendered as Qinarcheh and Qanizjeh, may refer to:

Qinarjeh, Ardabil
Qinarjeh-ye Olya, East Azerbaijan Province
Qinarjeh-ye Sofla, East Azerbaijan Province
Qinarjeh, Maragheh, East Azerbaijan Province
Qeynarjeh, Hamadan
Qinarjeh, Kurdistan
Qeynarjeh, Qazvin
Qinarjeh, Shahin Dezh, West Azerbaijan Province
Qinarjeh, Takab, West Azerbaijan Province
Qinarjeh, Zanjan
Qeynarjeh, Khodabandeh

See also
Gheynarjeh